A centrifugal fan is a mechanical device for moving air or other gases in a direction at an angle to the incoming fluid. Centrifugal fans often contain a ducted housing to direct outgoing air in a specific direction or across a heat sink; such a fan is also called a blower, blower fan, or squirrel-cage fan (because it looks like a hamster wheel). Tiny ones used in computers are sometimes called biscuit blowers.  These fans move air from the rotating inlet of the fan to an outlet.  They are typically used in ducted applications to either draw air through ductwork/heat exchanger, or push air through similar. impellers.  Compared to standard axial fans, they can provide similar air movement from a smaller fan package, and overcome higher resistance in air streams.

Centrifugal fans use the kinetic energy of the impellers to move the air stream, which in turn moves against the resistance caused by ducts, dampers and other components. Centrifugal fans displace air radially, changing the direction (typically by 90°) of the airflow. They are sturdy, quiet, reliable, and capable of operating over a wide range of conditions.

Centrifugal fans are, like axial fans, constant-volume devices, meaning that, at a constant fan speed, a centrifugal fan moves a relatively constant volume of air rather than a constant mass. This means that the air velocity in a system is fixed, but the actual mass of air flowing will vary based on the density of the air.  Variations in density can be caused by changes in incoming air temperature and elevation above sea level, making these fans unsuitable for applications where a constant mass of air is required to be provided.  

Centrifugal fans are not positive-displacement devices and centrifugal fans have certain advantages and disadvantages when contrasted with positive-displacement blowers: centrifugal fans are more efficient, whereas positive-displacement blowers may have a lower capital cost, and are capable of achieving much higher compression ratios.  Centrifugal fans are usually compared to axial fans for residential, industrial, and commercial applications.  Axial fans typically operate at higher volumes, operate at lower static pressures, and have higher efficiency.   Therefore axial fans are usually used for high volume air movement, such as warehouse exhaust or room circulation, while centrifugal fans are used to move air in ducted applications such as a house or typical office environment.  

The centrifugal fan has a drum shape composed of a number of fan blades mounted around a hub. As shown in the animated figure, the hub turns on a driveshaft mounted in bearings in the fan housing. The gas enters from the side of the fan wheel, turns 90 degrees and accelerates due to centrifugal force as it flows over the fan blades and exits the fan housing.

History 
The earliest mention of centrifugal fans was in 1556 by Georg Pawer (Latin:  Georgius Agricola) in his book De Re Metallica, where he shows how such fans were used to ventilate mines.  Thereafter, centrifugal fans gradually fell into disuse.  It wasn't until the early decades of the nineteenth century that interest in centrifugal fans revived. In 1815 the Marquis de Chabannes advocated the use of a centrifugal fan and took out a British patent in the same year. In 1827, Edwin A. Stevens of Bordentown, New Jersey, installed a fan for blowing air into the boilers of the steamship North America.  Similarly, in 1832, the Swedish-American engineer John Ericsson used a centrifugal fan as blower on the steamship Corsair.  A centrifugal fan was invented by Russian military engineer Alexander Sablukov in 1832, and was used both in the Russian light industry (such as sugar making) and abroad.

One of the most important developments for the mining industry was the Guibal fan, which was patented in Belgium in 1862 by the French engineer Théophile Guibal. The Guibal fan had a spiral case surrounding the fan blades, as well as a flexible shutter to control the escape velocity, which made it far superior to previous open-fan designs and led to the possibility of mining at great depths. Such fans were used extensively for mine ventilation throughout Britain.

Construction 

The main parts of a centrifugal fan are:
Fan housing
Impellers
Inlet and outlet ducts
Drive shaft
Drive mechanism
Fan Dampers and Vanes
Inlet and outlet ducts
Fan blades
Fan discharge casing

Other components used may include bearings, couplings, impeller locking device, fan discharge casing, shaft seal plates etc.

Drive mechanisms 
The fan drive determines the speed of the fan wheel (impeller) and the extent to which this speed can be varied. There are two basic types of fan drives.

Direct 
The fan wheel can be linked directly to the shaft of an electric motor. This means that the fan wheel speed is identical to the motor's rotational speed.  Direct drive is the most efficient form of fan drive since there are no losses converting from the motors rotational speed to the fan's.  

Some electronics manufacturers have made centrifugal fans with external rotor motors (the stator is inside the rotor), and the rotor is directly mounted on the fan wheel (impeller).

Belt 
A set of sheaves is mounted on the motor shaft and the fan wheel shaft, and a belt transmits the mechanical energy from the motor to the fan.

The fan wheel speed depends upon the ratio of the diameter of the motor sheave to the diameter of the fan wheel sheave.  Fan wheel speeds in belt-driven fans are fixed unless the belt(s) slip. Belt slippage can reduce the fan wheel speed by several hundred revolutions per minute (RPM).   Belts also introduce an additional maintenance item

Bearings 
Bearings are an important part of a fan. Sleeve-ring bearings are used for smaller fans such as computer fans, while larger residential and commercial applications use ball bearings.  Industrial applications may used specialized bearings such as water-cooled sleeve bearings for exhausting hot gasses.  

Many turbo blowers use either an air bearing or a magnetic bearing.

Magnetic bearing blowers provide low transmitted vibration, high-speed levitation, low power consumption, high reliability, oil-free operation and tolerance to particle contaminants in the air stream.

Speed control
Fan speed for modern fans is done through Variable Frequency Drives that directly control the motors speed, ramping up and down the speed of the motor to different airflows.  The amount of air moved is non-linear with the motor speed, and must be individually balanced for each fan installation.  Typically this is done at time of install by testing and balancing contractors, although some modern systems directly monitor airflow with instruments near the outlet, and can use the feedback to vary the motor speed.

Older fan installations would use inlet or outlet vanes - metal flaps that could be adjusted open and closed on the outlet of the fan. As the vanes closed they would raise the pressure and lower the airflow from the fan.  This is less efficient than a VFD, as the VFD directly reduces electricity used by the fan motor, while vanes worked with a constant motor speed.

Fan blades

The fan wheel consists of a hub with a number of fan blades attached. The fan blades on the hub can be arranged in three different ways: forward-curved, backward-curved or radial.

Forward-curved

Forward-curved blades, as in Figure 3(a), curve in the direction of the fan wheel's rotation. These are especially sensitive to particulates and commonly are only specified for clean-air applications such as air conditioning. Forward-curved fans are typically used in applications where the static pressure is too high for a vane axial fan or the smaller size of a centrifugal fan is required, but the noise characteristics of a backwards curved fan are disruptive for the space.  They are capable of providing lower air flow with a higher increase in static pressure compared to a vane axial fan. They are typically used in fan coil units.  They are less efficient than backwards curved fans.

Backward-curved
Backward-curved blades, as in Figure 3(b), curve against the direction of the fan wheel's rotation. Smaller blowers may have backward-inclined blades, which are straight, not curved. Larger backward-inclined/-curved blowers have blades whose backward curvatures mimic that of an airfoil cross section, but both designs provide good operating efficiency with relatively economical construction techniques.  These types of blowers are designed to handle gas streams with low to moderate particulate loadings .  They can be easily fitted with wear protection but certain blade curvatures can be  prone to solids build-up.. Backward curved wheels are often heavier than corresponding forward-curved equivalents, as they run at higher speeds and require stronger construction.

Backward curved fans can have a high range of specific speeds but are most often used for medium specific speed applications—high pressure, medium  flow applications such as in air handling units.

Backward-curved fans are more energy efficient than radial blade and forward curved fans and so, for high power applications may be a suitable alternative to the lower cost radial bladed fan.

Straight radial
Radial blowers, as in Figure 3(c), have wheels whose blades extend straight out from the centre of the hub. Radial bladed wheels are often used on particulate-laden gas streams because they are the least sensitive to solid build-up on the blades, but they are often characterized by greater noise output. High speeds, low volumes, and high pressures are common with radial blowers, and are often used in vacuum cleaners, pneumatic material conveying systems, and similar processes.

Principles of operation
The centrifugal fan uses the centrifugal power supplied from the rotation of impellers to increase the kinetic energy of air/gases. When the impellers rotate, the gas particles near the impellers are thrown off from the impellers, then move into the fan casing. As a result, the kinetic energy of gas is measured as pressure because of the system resistance offered by the casing and duct. The gas is then guided to the exit via outlet ducts. After the gas is thrown-off, the gas pressure in the middle region of the impellers decreases. The gas from the impeller eye rushes in to normalize this. This cycle repeats and therefore the gas can be continuously transferred.

Velocity triangle

A diagram called a velocity triangle helps us in determining the flow geometry at the entry and exit of a blade. A minimum number of data are required to draw a velocity triangle at a point on blade. Some component of velocity varies at different point on the blade due to changes in the direction of flow. Hence an infinite number of velocity triangles are possible for a given blade. To describe the flow using only two velocity triangles, we define mean values of velocity and their direction. Velocity triangle of any turbo machine has three components as shown:

U Blade velocity
Vr Relative Velocity
V Absolute velocity
These velocities are related by the triangle law of vector addition:

This relatively simple equation is used frequently while drawing the velocity diagram. The velocity diagram for the forward, backward face blades shown are drawn using this law. The angle α is the angle made by the absolute velocity with the axial direction and angle β is the angle made by blade with respect to axial direction.

Difference between fans and blowers
The property that distinguishes a centrifugal fan from a blower is the pressure ratio it can achieve. In general, a blower can produce a higher pressure ratio. Per the American Society of Mechanical Engineers (ASME), the specific ratio the ratio of the discharge pressure over the suction pressure – is used for defining fans, blowers and compressors. Fans have a specific ratio of up to 1.11, blowers from 1.11 to 1.20 and compressors have more than 1.20.  Typically due to the higher pressures involved blowers and compressors have much sturdier builds than fans.

Ratings
Ratings found in centrifugal fan performance tables and curves are based on standard air SCFM. Fan manufacturers define standard air as clean, dry air with a density of 0.075 pounds mass per cubic foot (1.2 kg/m3), with the barometric pressure at sea level of 29.92 inches of mercury (101.325 kPa) and a temperature of 70 °F (21 °C). Selecting a centrifugal fan to operate at conditions other than standard air requires adjustment to both static pressure and power.

At higher-than-standard elevation (sea level) and higher-than-standard temperature, air density is lower than standard density. Air density corrections must account for centrifugal fans that are specified for continuous operation at higher temperatures. The centrifugal fan displaces a constant volume of air in a given system regardless of air density.

When a centrifugal fan is specified for a given CFM and static pressure at conditions other than standard, an air density correction factor must be applied to select the proper size fan to meet the new condition. Since  air weighs only 80% of  air, the centrifugal fan creates less pressure and requires less power.

Air Movement and Control Association (AMCA) 
The centrifugal fan performance tables provide the fan RPM and power requirements for the given CFM and static pressure at standard air density. When the centrifugal fan performance is not at standard conditions, the performance must be converted to standard conditions before entering the performance tables. Centrifugal fans rated by the Air Movement and Control Association (AMCA) are tested in laboratories with test setups that simulate installations that are typical for that type of fan. Usually they are tested and rated as one of four standard installation types as designated in AMCA Standard 210.

AMCA Standard 210 defines uniform methods for conducting laboratory tests on housed fans to determine airflow rate, pressure, power and efficiency, at a given speed of rotation. The purpose of AMCA Standard 210 is to define exact procedures and conditions of fan testing so that ratings provided by various manufacturers are on the same basis and may be compared. For this reason, fans must be rated in standardized SCFM.

Losses

Centrifugal fans suffer efficiency losses in both stationary and moving parts, increasing the energy input required for a given level of airflow performance.

Impeller entry 
Flow at the intake and its turning from axial to radial direction causes losses at the intake. Friction and flow separation cause impeller blade losses since there is change in incidence angle. These impeller blade losses are also included in the category.

Leakage 
Leakage of some air and disturbance in the main flow field is caused due to the clearance provided between the rotating periphery of the impeller and the casing at the entry.

Impeller

Diffuser and volute 
Friction and flow separation also causes losses in the diffuser. Further losses due to incidence occur if the device is working beyond its design conditions. Flow from the impeller or diffuser expands in the volute, which has a larger cross section leading to the formation of eddy, which in turn reduces pressure head. Friction and flow separation losses also occur due to the volute passage.

Disc friction 
Viscous drag on the back surface of the impeller disc causes disc friction losses.

In literature 
In Walter Miller's science-fiction novel A Canticle for Leibowitz (1959), an order of monks in a post-apocalyptic 26th century safeguard an electrical blueprint for a "squirrel cage" as a holy relic, though puzzled over how to reveal the "squirrel".

See also

References

Ventilation fans
Turbomachinery